The 1941–42 Ranji Trophy was the eighth season of the Ranji Trophy. Bombay regained the title after six years defeating Mysore.

Highlights
 A. G. Ram Singh took his 100th Ranji wicket in the match between Madras and Hyderabad and completed 1,000 runs in the next match between Madras and United Provinces. He was the second player to complete this double in Ranji Trophy after Amar Singh in 1939–40
 Northern India defeated North West Frontier Province by an innings and 405 runs. It was the biggest margin of win in Ranji Trophy at the time. The present record is innings and 472 runs by Assam v Tripura in 1991/92.
 In their first innings of the season, the defending champion Maharashtra was bowled out for 39 by Nawanagar with Shute Banerjee taking 8 wickets for 25 runs.
 Future Test cricketer Putu Chowdhury took 11 wickets on his first class debut, for Bihar v Bengal. Bihar lost the match on a first innings deficit of 1 run.
 Madhav Mantri, making his debut as wicket-keeper for Bombay in semifinal, claimed 9 wickets, including five stumpings.

Zonal Matches

West Zone

East Zone

South Zone

North Zone

Inter-Zonal Knockout Stage

1st Semi-final

2nd Semi-final

Final

Scorecards and averages
Cricketarchive

References

External links

Ranji Trophy
Indian domestic cricket competitions
Ranji Trophy seasons